Probarbus labeaminor is a species of ray-finned fish in the family Cyprinidae.
It is found in Laos and Thailand.

References

Sources

Cyprinid fish of Asia
Fish of Laos
Fish of Thailand
Fish described in 1992
Taxonomy articles created by Polbot